Rexburg–Madison County Airport  is a public use airport located one nautical mile (2 km) northwest of the central business district of Rexburg, a city in Madison County, Idaho, United States. It is owned by the City of Rexburg and Madison County. This airport is included in the National Plan of Integrated Airport Systems for 2011–2015, which categorized it as a general aviation facility.

Facilities and aircraft 
Rexburg–Madison County Airport covers an area of 144 acres (58 ha) at an elevation of 4,862 feet (1,482 m) above mean sea level. It has one runway designated 17/35 with an asphalt surface measuring 4,204 by 75 feet (1,281 x 23 m).

For the 12-month period ending September 21, 2012, the airport had 31,150 aircraft operations, an average of 85 per day: 97.9% general aviation, 1.9% air taxi, and 0.2% military. At that time there were 68 aircraft based at this airport: 86.8% single-engine, 4.4% multi-engine, 4.4% helicopter, and 4.4% ultralight.

References

External links 
 Airport Board page at City of Rexburg website
 Rexburg-Madison County (RXE) at Idaho Transportation Department
 Aerial image as of July 1993 from USGS The National Map
 

Airports in Idaho
Madison County, Idaho